Janina Toljan (born 27 March 1990) is an Austrian former tennis player.

In her career, Toljan won three singles and five doubles titles on the ITF Circuit. On 20 October 2014, she reached her best singles ranking of world No. 437. On 28 September 2015, she peaked at No. 458 in the doubles rankings.

ITF Circuit finals

Singles: 8 (3 titles, 5 runner-ups)

Doubles: 21 (5–16)

External links
 
 

1990 births
Living people
Sportspeople from Linz
Austrian female tennis players
20th-century Austrian women
21st-century Austrian women